USS Miami may refer to:
 was a U.S. Revenue Cutter Service schooner-rigged steamer in service 1862−1871 
 was a side-wheel steam gunboat in use during the American Civil War
 was a light cruiser commissioned in 1943 and decommissioned in 1947
 was a Los Angeles-class nuclear attack submarine commissioned in 1990 and decommissioned in 2014

United States Navy ship names